Pedro Jufresa Lluch (born 2 May 1966) is a Spanish former field hockey player who competed in the 1992 Summer Olympics. He is the brother of Ramón Jufresa.

Notes

References

External links
 
 
 
 

1966 births
Living people
Spanish male field hockey players
Olympic field hockey players of Spain
Field hockey players at the 1992 Summer Olympics
1990 Men's Hockey World Cup players